Ophiacanthidae is a family of brittle stars. Axel Vilhelm Ljungman circumscribed this taxon in 1867; he initially named the subfamily Ophiacanthinae within the family Amphiuridae. Gordon L. J. Paterson promoted its rank to family in 1985.

, genera include:
 Ophiacantha 
 Ophiohamus 
 Brezinacantha

References

Ophiacanthida
Echinoderm families
Extant Early Cretaceous first appearances